Manuel III Afonso of Kongo, previously Manuel Martins Kiditu, was the last Mwenekongo (ruler) of the Kingdom of Kongo, ruling as a vassal of the Portuguese empire from 1911 to 1914. 

He was educated at Portuguese schools in Luanda and Huila. In 1893, he was hired as a page for Álvaro XIV of Kongo. He worked as an interpreter before settling in São Salvador in 1909. The royal family of Kongo chose him as ruler in 1911, on the death of Manuel Nkomba of Kongo. He was later described as "wise in the ways and customs of white men".

Manuel's reign over the reduced territory of the kingdom was ended by a revolt in 1914, at which point the Portuguese abolished the kingdom and assimilated the territory into the colony of Angola. By 1915, Manuel III also lost much of his claim to the throne, as the royal family recognized Álvaro XV Afonso Nzinga as ruler instead. He died of tuberculosis in 1927.

References

Manikongo of Kongo
19th-century births
1927 deaths